Tanintharyi National Park is a proposed national park in Myanmar's Tanintharyi Region that was supposed to cover an area of  of mangrove and evergreen forests at an elevation from sea level to . It was proposed in 2002. Wildlife species in this area include Asian elephant, sambar deer, Malayan tapir, Indian muntjac, and leopard.

References

National parks of Myanmar
Tenasserim Hills
Important Bird Areas of Myanmar